Mustafa Genç (born 5 April 1954) is a Turkish boxer. He competed in the men's light flyweight event at the 1984 Summer Olympics. At the 1984 Summer Olympics, he lost to Carlos Motta of Guatemala.

References

1954 births
Living people
Turkish male boxers
Olympic boxers of Turkey
Boxers at the 1984 Summer Olympics
Place of birth missing (living people)
Light-flyweight boxers
20th-century Turkish people